Məşədi Hüseynli (also, Məşədhüseynli, Meshadiguseynli, and Mashaduseynly) is a village and municipality in the Jalilabad Rayon of Azerbaijan.  It has a population of 107.

References 

Populated places in Jalilabad District (Azerbaijan)